is a 1957 Japanese drama film directed by Masaki Kobayashi.

Plot
University student Nishida moves into a rundown area near a US military base, where he gets acquainted with waitress Shizuko. Shizuko is raped by local gangster boss Joe and, although she despises him, is unable to put an end to their subsequent affair. Joe also helps Nishida's landlady to throw Nishida and the other tenants out of their flats in a scheme to make room for a new hotel, leaving them homeless. After a confrontation between Joe and Nishida, who has fallen in love with Shizuko as she has with him, Shizuko kills the drunken Joe by pushing him in front of a passing army truck.

Cast
 Ineko Arima as Shizuko
 Fumio Watanabe as Nishida
 Tatsuya Nakadai as Joe
 Asao Sano as Sakazaki
 Tomo Nagai as Okada
 Keiko Awaji as Yasuko
 Seiji Miyaguchi as Kin
 Isuzu Yamada as Landlady
 Eijirō Tōno as Kurihara
 Yōko Katsuragi as Sachiko
 Masao Shimizu as Kuroki
 Eiko Miyoshi as Procuress
 Natsuko Kahara
 Toyo Takahashi

Legacy
Black River was screened at the 2005 New York Film Festival in a theatrical retrospective celebrating the Shochiku Company's 110th year.

Notes

References

External links
 
 

1956 films
1950s Japanese-language films
Japanese black-and-white films
Films directed by Masaki Kobayashi
Shochiku films
Films based on Japanese novels
1950s Japanese films
Japanese drama films
1956 drama films